"Gonna Love Ya" is a song by Swedish EDM producer Avicii featuring Swedish singer Sandro Cavazza. It was released on 1 October 2015 as a promotional single from the album Stories.

Charts

Weekly charts

Year-end charts

Certifications

References

2015 songs
Avicii songs
Sandro Cavazza songs
Songs written by Avicii
Songs written by Arash Pournouri
Songs written by Sandro Cavazza